REDARC Electronics is an Australian electronics manufacturer established in 1979. It is located in Lonsdale, South Australia, an industrial suburb south of Adelaide.
 
REDARC products are used in vehicles that use battery power. Their range of products includes voltage converters, inverters, power supplies, battery chargers and trailer braking solutions for industries such as automotive and trucking, agricultural, medical and defence. It holds the patents for the technologies on which these products are developed.

In 2019, REDARC's Lonsdale facility added 3,000m2 of advanced manufacturing space in a $22 million development, enabling REDARC to increase its manufacturing capacity by 250% and increase productivity. The additional space now houses a new Surface Mount Technology line for loading electronic components, an Electromagnetic Compatibility chamber and a Vibration test lab. The Vibration test lab enables highly accelerated lifetime testing of products - simulating 10 years of life in just two days. Three new Universal Collaborative Robots ‘Cobots’ have also been purchased.

REDARC was listed in Deloitte Technology Fast 50 Australia list for three consecutive years - 2011, 2012 and 2013. The firm was also named the 2014 Telstra Business of the year and 2017 Global Media Award Winner for the Tow-Pro Elite Electronic Brake Controller at the SEMA Show in Las Vegas.

REDARC has made headway into the Defence sector and will team up with UK-based advanced manufacturing company MARL International to manufacture and support special light emitting diodes (LED) to be installed in the Type 26 Global Combat Ship-Australia (GCS-A), if BAE Systems secures the SEA 5000 Future Frigates contract.

References

1979 establishments in Australia
Electronics companies of Australia
Companies based in Adelaide